The European Nuclear Energy Tribunal (ENET) is an international tribunal, established 1 January 1960, that operates under the auspices of the Organisation for Economic Co-operation and Development (OECD).  Its member states are Austria, Belgium, Denmark, France, Germany, Ireland, Italy, Luxembourg, Netherlands, Norway, Portugal, Spain, Sweden, Switzerland, Turkey, and the United Kingdom. The tribunal was established by the Convention on the Establishment of the Security Control in the Field of Nuclear Energy, signed in 1957.

The purpose of the tribunal is to hear cases concerning liability over nuclear accidents. Formerly it also had the role of hearing cases concerning the violation of the European regional nuclear safeguards system operated by the OECD but that jurisdiction was suspended in the 1970s due to its duplication of the IAEA and the Euratom systems.

The tribunal consists of seven judges appointed to five-year terms.

The judges appointed for the 2020–2024 term of office are: Khalil Buhari (United Kingdom), Ida Sørebø (Norway), Ulla-Maija Moisio (Finland), Federica Porcellana (Italy), Miguel Sousa Ferro (Portugal), Ángel Fernando Pantaleón Prieto (Spain), Francis Delaporte (Luxembourg).

The President of the Tribunal is currently Francis Delaporte.

The Registrar of the Tribunal is currently Ximena Vásquez-Maignan, Head of Legal Affairs at the  Nuclear Energy Agency. The seat of the European Nuclear Energy Tribunal is in Paris, France, at the OECD offices.

In the over fifty years of its existence the tribunal has never been presented with a case.

References

External links
 European Nuclear Energy Tribunal page at the OECD Nuclear Energy Agency

International nuclear energy organizations
International courts and tribunals
OECD
Nuclear liability
Tribunals